The 2008 Formula Renault 2.0 UK Championship was the 20th British Formula Renault Championship season. The season began at Brands Hatch on March 29 and finished at the same venue on September 21, after twenty rounds. The championship was won by Adam Christodoulou with Dean Stoneman winning the Graduate Cup.

Teams and drivers

Calendar
All races held in United Kingdom.

* – race 12 was the replacement round for the second Croft race. Riki Christodoulou had originally won the pole in the qualifying session held.

Driver standings
Points are awarded to the drivers as follows:

Best 18 results count towards the championship.
 T. Pts—points if all races counted.
 Drop—two dropped scores.
 Pts—best 18 results.
 G. Pts—drivers in the Graduate Cup, with the best 15 results counting.

See also
2008 Formula Renault 2.0 UK Winter Cup

References

External links
 The official website of the Formula Renault UK Championship

UK
Formula Renault UK season
Renault 2.0 UK